Les Îles-de-la-Madeleine Regional County Municipality was a former regional county municipality and census division in the Gaspésie–Îles-de-la-Madeleine region of Quebec, Canada.

It was formed in 1981, and dissolved when all of its component municipalities amalgamated into the new Municipality of Les Îles-de-la-Madeleine on January 1, 2002, as part of the early 2000s municipal reorganization in Quebec.

Based on the last census prior to its dissolution, Les Îles-de-la-Madeleine consisted of:

Following a 2004 referendum, the municipality of Grosse-Île separated from Les Îles-de-la-Madeleine and was reestablished on January 1, 2006.  It is no longer incorporated within any regional county municipality, but remains part of the urban agglomeration of Les Îles-de-la-Madeleine.

See also 
 Municipal history of Quebec

References 

Former regional county municipalities in Quebec
Populated places disestablished in 2002